HMS Nottingham was a batch two Type 42 destroyer of the Royal Navy, named after the city of Nottingham, England. She was launched on 18 February 1980, and commissioned on 8 April 1983 as the sixth warship to bear the name.

Her commanding officer at commissioning was Commander Nigel Essenhigh (in his first major command role) who went on to become First Sea Lord.

On her first cruise to Oporto, Portugal and then Gibraltar the destroyer lost two sailors to a drowning incident while on shore leave visiting a beach in Oporto.

In November 2000, Nottingham completed a major refit, which was intended to extend her operational life to 2012, although she was later placed in reserve and decommissioned on 11 February 2010.

Service history

2002 grounding

A  hole was torn down the side of the vessel from bow to bridge, flooding five of her compartments and nearly causing her to sink. HMNZS Te Mana and HMNZS Endeavour provided relief for the crew for approximately 2–3 weeks.

The accident happened in poor weather after a set of manoeuvres to allow a sailor with an emergency medical condition to be evacuated to Lord Howe Island. The captain, Commander Richard Farrington, had been ashore having dinner with the island's marine services manager thanking him for the assistance rendered to his crewman. Farrington had just returned and at the time of the incident the Executive Officer (XO), Lt Commander John Lea, was in-charge of the vessel. Nottingham ran aground on Wolf Rock owing to a navigational error and the vessel immediately went into damage control mode. Commander Farrington returned to the bridge whereby he took command and controlled the breached compartments.

The Ministry of Defence (MoD) salvage department (SALMO) was contacted and assisted with logistics through local marine expert Graeme Mackenzie. The SALMO team, assisted by Nottingham's crew, stabilized her at sea making her ready for the journey into Newcastle.

On 6 August, Nottingham set out on her journey to the port of Newcastle, north of Sydney, towed stern-first because of the damage to her bow. In Newcastle, her Sea Dart missiles were removed and further repairs were carried out. Royal Navy personnel, Operations Manager Mr Graeme Mackenzie, RN Commander Anthony Holberry and SALMO Mr James Ward took charge of the shore-side recovery programme without incident.

It was not clear whether it was economic to repair her, but Nottingham had recently undergone major modifications to her radar and other electronics, and it was determined that it would be less expensive to return her to the UK and repair her than to bring another Type 42 destroyer up to her new specification.

After arriving in Sydney on 15 October, the damaged ship was lifted on board the heavy lifting vessel  and welded to her deck for transport. On 28 October, Nottingham left Sydney harbour on board MV Swan for the journey back to the UK. By 9 December, she had arrived at Portsmouth Harbour for repairs at Fleet Support Limited. The destroyer  was temporarily reactivated to cover for Nottingham while she was being repaired.

On 7 July 2003, the anniversary of the collision, Nottingham was refloated. In April 2004 she sailed again following the £39m repair and refit. The ship returned to duty in July 2004.

The crew laid wreaths in remembrance to those who died in service for their country.

Disposal
In April 2008, she was placed in a state of "extended readiness" at Portsmouth. With her crew dispersed, she did not sail again before being decommissioned on 11 February 2010. She was put up for auction on 28 March 2011, which resulted in her sale for scrap to Leyal Ship Recycling. She was towed out of Portsmouth en route to Turkey on 19 October 2011.

Affiliations
 The Mercian Regiment
 No. 8 Squadron RAF
 No. 56(R) Squadron RAF
307 (South Nottinghamshire Hussars Yeomanry RHA) Battery, 100 (Yeomanry) Regiment, Royal Artillery
 Worshipful Company of Saddlers
 City of Nottingham

References

External links

 Official HMS Nottingham website of the Royal Navy
 BBC Virtual Tour
 BBC 360° Tour

 

Cold War destroyers of the United Kingdom
History of Nottingham
Military history of Nottinghamshire
1980 ships
Type 42 destroyers of the Royal Navy
Ships built in Southampton
Non-combat naval accidents